Coeli may refer to:

The Imum Coeli is the point in space where the ecliptic crosses the meridian in the north
Porta Coeli is one of the oldest church structures in the Western hemisphere. 
3276 Porta Coeli (1982 RZ1) is a Main-belt Asteroid discovered on September 15, 1982, by A. Mrkos at Klet.
The Regina Coeli is an ancient Latin Marian Hymn of the Christian Church
Regina Coeli (prison), the most notorious prison in Rome
Regina Coeli is a Latin name that means "Queen of Heaven" depicting the Virgin Mary, most commonly used among Roman Catholics.
Santa Maria Scala Coeli is a church on the site of St Paul the Apostle's prison on Via delle Tre Fontane in Rome.
Scala Coeli is a village and commune in the province of Cosenza in the Calabria region of southern Italy.